Cunningham-Hall PT-6 NC692W is one of two surviving aircraft of its type from the early days of aviation in the history of Alaska. The Cunningham-Hall PT-6 is a single-engine six-seat cabin biplane built by the Cunningham-Hall Aircraft Corporation, which was designed mainly as a personal transport. The aircraft, registered as NC692W, with c/n. 2962, was built in 1930 and is the second of its kind constructed. It was entirely rebuilt as a static display using non-airworthy materials in the 1970s.

At the time of its listing on the National Register of Historic Places in 1978, it was stationed at the Transportation Museum of Alaska, in Palmer.  It was later moved to the Alaska Museum of Transportation and Industry in Wasilla, Alaska.

See also
National Register of Historic Places listings in Matanuska-Susitna Borough, Alaska

References

1930s United States airliners
Aircraft on the National Register of Historic Places
National Register of Historic Places in Matanuska-Susitna Borough, Alaska
Transportation on the National Register of Historic Places in Alaska
Individual aircraft
Wasilla, Alaska